Suntec may refer to:

 Suntec City, a multi-use development in Singapore
Suntec Singapore Convention and Exhibition Centre
 SUNTECH Tower, a business tower in Penang, Malaysia
 Suntech Power, a Chinese producer of solar panels